Carinodrillia buccooensis is a species of sea snail, a marine gastropod mollusk in the family Pseudomelatomidae.This species of sea snail is additionally a member of the Gastropoda class and the Caenogastropoda subclass which encompasses marine, brackish, fresh and terrestrial life

Description
The shell is up to 18.1 mm. in length. The sea snail is white in colour and is tainted with slight pink rings. The apertural view of the shell, shown in the image, displays this characteristic of the shell.

Distribution
This species occurs in the Caribbean Sea off Tobago, Martinique and Guadeloupe.

References

 Nowell-Usticke, G. W. "A supplementary listing of new shells (illustrated), revised edition, to be added to the check list of the marine shells of St. Croix." (1971).

External links
 
 
 Boyko, Christopher B., and James R. Cordeiro. "Catalog of Recent type specimens in the Division of Invertebrate Zoology, American Museum of Natural History. V. Mollusca, part 2 (class Gastropoda [exclusive of Opisthobranchia and Pulmonata], with supplements to Gastropoda [Opisthobranchia], and Bivalvia)." Bulletin of the American Museum of Natural History (2001): 1-170

buccooensis
Gastropods described in 1971